The 1999–2000 St. Francis Terriers men's basketball team represented St. Francis College during the 1999–2000 NCAA Division I men's basketball season. The team was coached by Ron Ganulin, who was in his ninth year at the helm of the St. Francis Terriers. The Terrier's home games were played at the  Generoso Pope Athletic Complex. The team has been a member of the Northeast Conference since 1981.

The Terriers finished the season at 18–12 overall and 12–6 in conference play.

Roster

Schedule and results

|-
!colspan=12 style="background:#0038A8; border: 2px solid #CE1126;;color:#FFFFFF;"| Regular season

|-
!colspan=12 style="background:#0038A8; border: 2px solid #CE1126;;color:#FFFFFF;"| 2000 NEC tournament

References

St. Francis Brooklyn Terriers men's basketball seasons
St. Francis
St. Francis
St. Francis